Gold Rush Kid is the third studio album by English singer-songwriter George Ezra, released on 10 June 2022 by Columbia Records. The album was promoted by four singles: "Anyone for You (Tiger Lily)", "Green Green Grass", "Dance All Over Me" and "Sweetest Human Being Alive". It became his third consecutive number-one album in the UK.

Track listing
All songs written by George Ezra and Joel Pott, except where noted; all tracks produced by Joel Pott, except where noted.

Personnel
Musicians

 George Ezra – lead vocals (all tracks); background vocals, guitar (1–9, 11, 12)
 Joel Pott – background vocals, guitar, keyboards (1–9, 11, 12); programming (1, 3–7, 11, 12), synthesizer (1–9, 11, 12), bass (2–7, 10, 12), piano (2, 3, 7, 8, 11, 12), percussion (3, 4, 12), drums (8)
 Jimmy Sims – bass (all tracks), background vocals (1–6, 9, 11), percussion (3)
 Dan Grech-Marguerat – programming
 Fabio De Oliveira – background vocals (1–6, 9, 11), drums (1–7, 11), percussion (1–9)
 Lily Carassik – background vocals (1–4, 9), brass (1, 3, 4)
 Yasmin Ogilvie – background vocals (1–4, 9), brass (1, 3, 4)
 Daniel Moyler – background vocals (1–4, 6, 11); guitar, keyboards, programming, synthesizer (6)
 Mzansi Youth Choir – background vocals (1)
 Jim Hunt – brass (1, 3, 4), performance arrangement (1, 3), saxophone (5)
 Matthew Benson – brass (1, 3, 4), background vocals (9)
 Nikolaj Torp Larsen – keyboards, synthesizer (1–7, 11); piano (1, 2, 4–12), bass (2), background vocals (6)
 Adam Scarborough – background vocals (2, 11)
 Evie Howard – background vocals (2, 5)
 Freddie Lawrence – background vocals (2)
 Jessica Barnett – background vocals (2, 5, 9, 11)
 Myla Pott – background vocals (2, 5)
 Stuart Price – bass, guitar, keyboards, synthesizer (2)
 The Dap Kings – brass, performance arrangement (2)
 Cochemea Gastelum – saxophone (2)
 Ian Hendrickson-Smith – saxophone (2)
 Dave Guy – trumpet (2)
 Barney Lister – programming (4, 7, 11); bass, keyboards, synthesizer (4)
 Hal Ritson – drums, programming (4)
 Richard Adlam – drums, programming (4)
 David Klinke – guitar (4, 8)
 Tobie Tripp – conductor, performance arrangement (5, 7, 8, 10, 11)
 Ian Burdge – cello (5, 7, 8, 10, 11)
 Marianne Haynes – violin (5, 7, 8, 10, 11)
 Max Baillie – violin (5, 7, 8, 10, 11)
 Bruce White – viola (7, 8, 10)
 Ian Mizen – whistles (7)
 Bryony Elizabeth Moody – cello (8, 11)
 Chris Worsey – cello (8, 11)
 Andrew Parker – viola (8, 11)
 Kate Musker – viola (8, 11)
 Ian Humphries – violin (8, 11)
 Kate Robinson – violin (8, 11)
 Nicky Sweeney – violin (8, 11)
 Nirupam Raja Halder – violin (8, 11)
 Oli Langford – violin (8, 11)
 Tamara Elias – violin (8, 11)

Technical
 Matt Colton – mastering
 Charles Haydon-Hicks – mixing
 Dan Grech-Marguerat – mixing
 Luke Burgoyne – mixing (1, 3–12)
 Daniel Moyler – engineering
 Andy Maxwell – engineering (5), engineering assistance (8)
 Jonny Breakwell – engineering assistance
 Joe Wyatt – engineering assistance (5, 8)
 Tristan Ellis – engineering assistance (6, 8, 11)
 Ben Loveland – engineering assistance (7)
 Connor Panayi – engineering assistance (7, 10)
 Felipe Gutierrez – engineering assistance (7)

Charts

Weekly charts

Year-end charts

Certifications

See also
 List of UK Albums Chart number ones of 2022

References

2022 albums
Albums produced by Stuart Price
George Ezra albums
Sony Music albums